La Montagne is a commune in the Haute-Saône department in the region of Bourgogne-Franche-Comté in eastern France. It is part of the Vosges Massif with which it shares a common cultural and historical mountain ancestry.

Its inhabitants are called the Montaignions.

See also
Communes of the Haute-Saône department

References

Communes of Haute-Saône